Church of the Good Shepherd is a historic church at 601 Cole Street off U.S. Route 169 in Coleraine, Minnesota.  The church is also known as "The Log Church" and was built in 1908.  John C. Greenway, a member of the parish, supervised the construction of the church.  The logs were harvested from a patch of land that had previously never been logged.  The interior is built entirely of wood, and the altar rail and lectern are made of birch logs.  The church was dedicated by Bishop James Dow Morrison on November 15, 1908.

The church was listed on the National Register of Historic Places in 1980.  It closed on December 26, 1982, due to declining enrollment.  In March 1987, its owner, Christ Episcopal Church in Grand Rapids deeded the church to the city, with the understanding that it would be restored and maintained to continue to qualify for the National Register.  The community organized a Log Church Preservation Committee to perform maintenance and restoration tasks.  The church is available for weddings, special events, and cultural events.

References

1908 establishments in Minnesota
Buildings and structures in Itasca County, Minnesota
Churches on the National Register of Historic Places in Minnesota
Churches completed in 1908
Episcopal church buildings in Minnesota
National Register of Historic Places in Itasca County, Minnesota
Log buildings and structures on the National Register of Historic Places in Minnesota